Laurie Sapper (15 September 1922 – 26 August 1989) was a British trade unionist.

Born in Hammersmith, Sapper worked as a Senior Instructor in the Royal Air Force during World War II and also joined the Communist Party of Great Britain (CPGB).  After the war, he worked for the Ministry of Agriculture while qualifying as a barrister, but never practised, instead writing and broadcast on legal issues.  He also became Assistant General Secretary of the Institution of Professional Civil Servants, then later Deputy General Secretary of the Post Office Engineering Union.

In 1969, Sapper became General Secretary of the Association of University Teachers, a post which he held until 1983, during which time the union affiliated to the Trades Union Congress.  In retirement, he supported the Morning Star group against the CPGB leadership, and defected to the new Communist Party of Britain.

Sapper's younger brother Alan also became the leader of a trade union.

References

1929 births
1983 deaths
Communist Party of Great Britain members
Communist Party of Britain members
General secretaries of British trade unions
People from Hammersmith
Royal Air Force personnel of World War II
English barristers
English trade unionists
20th-century English lawyers